Addis Ababa Science and Technology University (Amharic: አዲስ አበባ ሳይንስና ቴክኖሎጂ ዩኒቨርስቲ), or AASTU, is an Ethiopian higher institute in Addis Ababa, Ethiopia. The main campus is located in the Akaky Kaliti subcity, Kilinto area.

The concept of Addis Ababa Science and Technology University had a direct and reasonable connection with the Five-Year Growth and Transformation Plan (2010-2015) of the government of the Federal Democratic Republic of Ethiopia. As it was stated in the plan, the establishment of well institutionalized and strong science and technology universities and institutes of technology will serve as a cornerstone to build an economically developed and industrialized state of Ethiopia. As a result, AASTU was founded in 2011 under the Directive of the Council of Ministers No. 216/2011 by admitting the first batch (2000 students) in November 2011.

Currently, the university has enrolled more than 8000 undergraduate (under regular and continuing education program) and close to 700 postgraduate students under its nine applied sciences, technology, engineering and ICT focused schools. AASTU is a university in the making, and much of its short-term plans aim at establishing academic infrastructures and facilities, staff recruitment and manpower development. So far, the university managed to recruit 472 academic staff and 391 administrative staff.

Colleges 

 College of Architecture and Civil Engineering 
 College of Natural and Social Sciences 
 College of Electrical and Mechanical Engineering 
 College of Applied Science
 College of Biological and Chemical Engineerng

See Also 
List of universities and colleges in Ethiopia

Addis Ababa University

References 

Universities and colleges in Ethiopia
Education in Addis Ababa